John Kevin Paul Keegan (born 5 August 1981) is an English former professional footballer who played as a full-back in the Football League for York City, and in non-League football for Scarborough and Rossendale United.

References

External links

1981 births
Living people
Footballers from Liverpool
English footballers
Association football defenders
York City F.C. players
Scarborough F.C. players
Rossendale United F.C. players
English Football League players
National League (English football) players